Haru is a Taiwanese Hokkien television drama that began airing on TTV Main Channel in Taiwan on 7 May 2015, from Mondays to Fridays, and ends on 21 July 2015, with a total of 54 episodes.

Cast

Main cast
 Allison Lin as Chun Mei (Haru)
 Lin Jianxuan as Young Chun Mei (Haru)
 Junior Han as Lin Junyan (Hiko)
 Yankee Yang as Miyamoto Tsuyoshi
 Darren Chiu as Zhuang He Tai
 Bing Cheng Yu as Young Zhuang He Tai
 Jenna Wang as Zhao Kuan Mei (Hiromi)
 Patrick Lee as Nakamura Kouhei

Other casts
 Chu De-Kang as Lin Qingtang (Lin Sensei)
 Ye En as Young Lin Qingtang
 Xi Man-Ning as Lin Chen Wenying (Sakura)
 Chang Hsiao Lan as Young Chen Wenying
 Lin Nai-hua as Ah Hao Shen
 Akio Chen as Zhuang Da Jin
 Teddy Wang as Dr. Chen Wenqian
 Blaire Chang as Zheng Wenxiu
 Cao Jingjun as Shunji Ono
 Felicia Huang as Qin Jia Mei
 John Chen as Zhao Rong San
 Hu Xiaofang as Li Xiulian
 Julianne Chu as Kamei Yoko
 Zhang Mingjie as Ryuji Miyamoto

Guest stars
 Segami Tsuyoshi as Mr. Chitutaro Muraoka
 Ann Lee as Ah Yue
 Chen Qin as Ah Man Yi
 Wu Pong-fong as Li Tiansheng
 Wu Guozhou as Ah Fei
 Jun Harada as Mr. Kamei
 Mokudai Yusuke as Minister of State Police
 Takashi Okamoto as Deputy Director
 Kan'nan Yūji as High-profile Inspection
 Kotaro Okitsu as Yasuhito, Prince Chichibu
 Cai Yijun as Ah Cai
 Eriku Yoza as Japanese Army Deserter
 Huang Wen-hsing as Huang Zhengyi
 Johnny Yin as Chiang Wei-shui
 Mario Pu as Zhang Wenhua
 Rika Arai as Sato Ayumi
 He Yishan as Wang Li-zhen
 Li Yining as Cai Guifen
 Guo Ying as Chen Yuzhi
 Ming Yang as Ah Hui
 Zhou Zijun as Zheng Wenxiu's Mother
 Tong Yijun as Huang Sang
 Xu Haoxiang as Ah Xiong
 Shih Ming-Shuai as Liu Mingde
 Zai Xing Chang as Onitsuka
 Chen Enzhen as Ah Jian
 Xiao Min Qian as Zhou Hanmin
 Pan Huangzuo as Ah Yi
 He Shengfei as Ah Xi
 Huang Luyao as Momoco
 Mami Fujioka as Kawashima
 Liu Xiangjun as Jiang Qiuhua
 Zhu Guohong as Lin Tangshan

Taiwanese drama television series
2015 Taiwanese television series debuts
2015 Taiwanese television series endings
Hokkien-language television shows
Taiwan Television original programming